Hearty Mart is a rural and semi-urban retail chain founded by Nadeem Jafri, Hearty Mart is a part of IIMA case study, ECCH (European Case Clearing House), Entrepreneurship Development Institute of India and other institutes.

Overview 
Hearty Mart started as a retail store in Juhapura, and eventually started focusing on rural empowerment with its franchisee retail model. The group is now involved in  Convenience food, Spice, Bakery, Tea processing as well as the Hospitality industry. Their major outlets are based in Ahmedabad, Siddhpur, Dholka, Morbi and various rural and semi urban areas of Gujarat. During lockdown in Gujarat, Hearty Mart played a key role in providing free ration kits.

History 
Hearty Mart initially started up as a super market in Juhapura, Ahmedabad in 2004 by Mr. Jafri. To provide a modern retail experience to the bottom-of-the-pyramid, the group started its franchisee network at smaller towns like Ilol, Pipodar, Kakoshi, Vadnagar and Idar. These stores are up to 600 sq feet size based on the location and other factors. To improve their backward integration they have started supply chain business. Now the group is detail in different verticals like Bakery, HoReCa, Manufacturing, Spices etc.

In 2023, Hearty Mart started their Dubai operations, they started brand studio at Deira Island, Dubai.

Hearty Mart Enterprise companies 

 Hearty Mart Supermarket
 Hearty Mart Packaging Solutions
 Hearty Mart Tea Packers
 Bakers Point / Bakers Cafe
 Hearty Mart Farm2Market
 Hearty Mart Hospitality Services

References 

Retail companies of India
Supermarkets of India
Retail companies established in 2004